Leucostethus fugax is a species of frog in the family Dendrobatidae. It is endemic to the valley of Pastaza River, on the eastern slope of the Cordillera Oriental, southern Ecuador.
Its natural habitats are moist forests, in a transition zone between humid tropical forest and very humid premontane forest. It is threatened by habitat loss.

References

fugax
Amphibians of the Andes
Amphibians of Ecuador
Endemic fauna of Ecuador
Amphibians described in 1993
Taxonomy articles created by Polbot